Giovanna Scoccimarro (born 10 November 1997) is a German judoka. She is the 2017 European silver medalist in the 70 kg division. In 2021, she competed in the women's 70 kg event at the 2020 Summer Olympics in Tokyo, Japan.

In 2020, she competed in the women's 70 kg event at the 2020 European Judo Championships held in Prague, Czech Republic.

In 2021, she won one of the bronze medals in her event at the 2021 Judo World Masters held in Doha, Qatar. At the 2021 Judo Grand Slam Abu Dhabi held in Abu Dhabi, United Arab Emirates, she won the gold medal in her event.

References

External links
 

1997 births
German female judoka
German people of Italian descent
Living people
Olympic judoka of Germany
Judoka at the 2020 Summer Olympics
Medalists at the 2020 Summer Olympics
Olympic medalists in judo
Olympic bronze medalists for Germany